Jeong Jin-hwan (born April 28, 1993), is a South Korean singer, rapper and actor. He is a former member and leader of the boy group The Man BLK under Stardium Entertainment. He is best known for his role in  A Love So Beautiful (2020).

Filmography

Television series

References

External links
 

1997 births
Living people
South Korean male idols
South Korean male pop singers
South Korean male rappers
South Korean male television actors
South Korean male web series actors
21st-century South Korean  male singers
21st-century South Korean male actors